John Björn Sture Kjellman (born 4 June 1963), is a Swedish actor and singer.

Kjellman was born in Östra Grevie, Scania. He played roles in Swedish movies like Klassfesten and Livet är en schlager, in which he plays a Melodifestivalen-obsessed transvestite who is brother to Helena Bergström's character, who takes part in the Swedish Melodifestivalen in the movie.

Kjellman participated in Melodifestivalen 2006 with the song "Älskar du livet", and reached the final where it ended up 9th.

He played the iconic Pelle in SVT 1997 Julkalender ”Pelle Svanslös”.

He took part in Stjärnorna på slottet in 2020, broadcast on SVT.

Selected filmography
 The Guardian Angel (1990)
Pelle Svanslös (1997)
 Vägen ut (1999)
 Livet är en schlager (2000)
 Klassfesten (2002)
 Behind Blue Skies (2010)
 Nobel's Last Will (2012)
 Fallet (2017)

References

External links

1963 births
Living people
People from Vellinge Municipality
Swedish male actors
Swedish male singers
Melodifestivalen contestants
Swedish television personalities
Best Actor Guldbagge Award winners